Evelyn Magluyan (born September 5, 1944) is a Filipino gymnast. She competed in five events at the 1964 Summer Olympics.

References

External links
 

1944 births
Living people
Filipino female artistic gymnasts
Olympic gymnasts of the Philippines
Gymnasts at the 1964 Summer Olympics
Place of birth missing (living people)